Chaiturus is a genus of plants in the family Lamiaceae, first described in 1787. It contains only one known species, Chaiturus marrubiastrum, native to central and southern Europe (Germany, Poland, Spain, Italy, Balkans, Ukraine, etc.), Russia, Turkey, Caucasus, and Central Asia (Altai, Xinjiang, Kazakhstan, Uzbekistan, Kyrgyzstan). False motherwort is a common name for this species.

References

Lamiaceae
Flora of Europe
Flora of temperate Asia
Monotypic Lamiaceae genera